Yelena Feliksovna Usievich (4 March 1893, Yakutsk, Russian Empire – 15 January 1968, Moscow, Soviet Union) was a Soviet and Russian literary critic and editor of Literaturnyi kritik.

Life
Yelena Usievich was the daughter of the Polish revolutionary Feliks Kon, Platon Kerzhentsev's predecessor as head of the All Union Radio Committee, and Khristiana Grinberg. She was born in Siberia in 1893. In April 1917 she and her first husband, Grigory A. Usievich, returned to Russia from Swiss exile in Lenin's 'sealed train'. They had a son together, who died aged 17 in 1934, and Grigory himself died aged twenty-seven in the Russian Civil War. Yelena Usievich worked in the Cheka, under Yuri Larin at the Economic Council, and at the Crimean Theater Repertory Censorship Committee. With her second husband Alexander Taxer, a Far Eastern Bolshevik who became second secretary of the Crimean Party Committee, she had a daughter, Iskra-Marina, in 1926. Alexander Taxer died in 1931. In 1932 Yelena graduated from the Institute of Red Professors.

Yelena Usievich edited the journal Literaturnyi kritik, founded in 1933. In May 1937 she published a controversial article there, 'On Political Poetry', arguing that poetry needed to be "sincere" and encompass the full range of human feelings, rather than be simplistic and "impersonal" translations of political platforms into verse. As Usievich put it, "in Mayakovsky's cries about love unrequited there was more social content than in many lamentations on political themes written by the minor epigones of popular poetry." In 1939 she made similar arguments defending the lyric poetry of Stepan Shchipachev.

References

1893 births
1968 deaths
20th-century Russian women writers
People from Yakutsk
People of the Russian Civil War
Bolsheviks
Communist Party of the Soviet Union members
Institute of Red Professors alumni
Recipients of the Order of the Red Banner of Labour
Russian literary critics
Soviet literary critics
Russian women critics
Soviet women writers
Women literary critics